MAD2L1-binding protein is a protein that in humans is encoded by the MAD2L1BP gene.

Function 

The protein encoded by this gene was identified as a binding protein of the MAD2 mitotic arrest deficient-like 1 (MAD2/MAD2L1). MAD2 is a key component of the spindle checkpoint that delays the onset of anaphase until all the kinetochores are attached to the spindle. This protein may interact with the spindle checkpoint and coordinate cell cycle events in late mitosis. Alternatively spliced transcript variants encoding distinct isoforms have been observed.

Interactions 

MAD2L1BP has been shown to interact with TRIP13.

References

Further reading